Novy is a rural locality (a settlement) in Vinogradovsky District, Arkhangelsk Oblast, Russia. The population was 4 as of 2010.

Geography 
Novy is located on the Severnaya Dvina River, 11 km northwest of Bereznik (the district's administrative centre) by road. Pyanda is the nearest rural locality.

References 

Rural localities in Vinogradovsky District